Heath End is a small village in Hampshire between Tadley and Baughurst.

Governance
The village is part of the civil parish of Tadley and is part of the Baughurst and Tadley North ward of Basingstoke and Deane borough council. The borough council is a Non-metropolitan district of Hampshire County Council.

Parish vs. Post Town
The matter of which parish Heath End belongs to can be confusing, as its post town was once Baughurst. This was purely due to location of the delivery office and is in fact no longer correct, as Baughurst is now covered by the Tadley post town.

Church
Heath End has a red brick Church dedicated to Saint Mary which was built in 1874.The Buildings of England, Hampshire and the Isle of Wight, Nikolas Pevesner and David Lloyd, Penguin Books, pub. 1967, p.286

See also 
 List of places in Hampshire

References

External links

Villages in Hampshire